Just the Two of Us may refer to:

Music

Albums
 Just the Two of Us (Matt Dusk and Margaret album), 2015 (or the title song)
 Just the Two of Us (Porter Wagoner and Dolly Parton album), 1968
 Just the Two of Us (Secret Garden album), 2014
 Just the Two of Us, a 1982 album by John Holt
 Just the Two of Us... Me and Them, a 2004 album by Mindflow

Songs
 "Just the Two of Us" (Grover Washington, Jr. song), 1981, with vocals by Bill Withers
 "Just the Two of Us" (Will Smith song), 1998 (which heavily samples the above song)
 "Just the Two of Us", a 1997 song by Eminem later retitled "'97 Bonnie & Clyde" (1998)
 "Just the Two of Us", a 2013 single by Davichi from an album, Mystic Ballad Pt. 2
 "Just the Two of Us", a remix from Austin Powers: The Spy Who Shagged Me

Television and film
 Just the Two of Us (TV series), a British reality singing contest
 The Dark Side of Tomorrow, a 1970 American film later re-released as Just the Two of Us